, son of regent Nijō Tsunahira, was a Japanese kugyō (court noble) of the Edo period. He held a regent position kampaku from 1736 to 1737. He married a daughter of the fourth head of Kaga Domain Maeda Tsunanori. Nijō Munehira was his son. Also, one of his daughters was a consort of Emperor Sakuramachi.

Family 
Parents
Father: Nijō Tsunahira (二条 綱平, 1672–1732)
Mother: Imperial Princess Masako (1673–1746; 栄子内親王), daughter of Emperor Reigen and Empress Takatsukasa Fusako
Consorts and issues:
Wife: Maeda Toshiko (前田 利子), also known as Naohime (直姫, 16 November 1693 – 24 January 1749), daughter of Maeda Tsunanori
Nijō Junko (二条淳子, 1713 – 1774) Wife of Imperial Prince Arisugawa-no-miya Yorihito (son of Emperor Reigen), first daughter
Nijō Ieko (二条舎子, 1716 – 1790), Empress Consort of Emperor Sakuramachi, second daughter
Concubine: a Court lady (家女房)
Nijō Munehira (二条 宗熙, 27 December  1718 – 3 August 1738), first son
Concubine: Lady Rinshōin (理性院)
Ruimyoin Rikuni (瑞妙院日護尼, 1717 – 1746, Nun at Zuiryū-ji (Toyama), third daughter
Takashi (隆遍, 1721 – 1777), Priest at  Kōfuku-ji, second son
Yūjō (祐常, 1723 – 1773), third son
Nijō Yoshiko (二条喜子, 1728 – 1745), concubine of Nijō Munemoto (二条 宗基), fourth daughter

References
 

1689 births
1737 deaths
Fujiwara clan
Yoshitada